Sciocoris microphthalmus is a species of stink bug in the family Pentatomidae. It is found in Europe and Northern Asia (excluding China), North America, and Southern Asia.

References

External links

 

Sciocorini
Articles created by Qbugbot
Insects described in 1860